Tenang is a state constituency in Johor, Malaysia, that is represented in the Johor State Legislative Assembly.

History

Polling districts 
According to the gazette issued on 24 March 2018, the Tenang constituency has a total of 12 polling districts.

Representation history

Election Results

References 

Johor state constituencies